The Federation of South African Labour Unions (FEDSAL) was a national trade union federation in South Africa.

History
The federation was established in 1959, as the Federation of Salaried Staff Associations, by four unions representing white-collar white workers:

 Electricity Supply Commission Salaried Staff Association
 Industrial Salaried Staff Association
 Mine Surface Chemicals Association
 South African Broadcasting Staff Association

The federation achieved little over the years, by 1985, its affiliates had changed to:

 Motor Industry Staff Association
 Nedbank Staff Association
 Underground Officials' Association
 Vereeniging van Gesalarieerde Nywerheidspersoneel

The dissolution of the Trade Union Council of South Africa in 1986 attracted new affiliates.  It campaigned against the introduction of Value Added Tax, for a National Economic Forum, and to restructure the National Manpower Commission.  It began admitting unions representing any workers, and in 1992 renamed itself as FEDSAL.  By 1993, it had 13 affiliates, with a total of 204,176 members.

In 1997, the federation merged with the Federation of Organisations Representing Civil Employees, to form the Federation of Unions of South Africa (FEDUSA).

Affiliates

References

National trade union centres of South Africa
Trade unions established in 1959
Trade unions disestablished in 1997